The Suzuki GSR600 is a  16 valve inline-four engine motorcycle made by Suzuki since in 2006, introduced as a streetfighter-styled middleweight street-bike using the 2004 GSXR-600 engine. The engine is re-tuned for more usable midrange power as well as higher torque. The rear shock's rebound and compression is adjustable.

History

With a tuned GSX-1300R Hayabusa engine, as well as a radical design for a street bike, it left a major impression to motorcycle enthusiasts everywhere.
However, the B-King did not hit production (although it finally did in 2007). Instead, the GSR600 a stripped-naked bike was unveiled in December 2005, with the tag of "Modern Art meets Race Technology". With a very similar design styling, it was initially nicknamed the "Baby B-King" or "Baby King". It had parts normally reserved for higher-end flagship models but incorporated into this motorcycle, such as the four-piston Tokico brake system used also on the GSX-R600 series.

2006 model
The first model arrived at dealerships in January 2006.

2006 S-model
A variant of the model, called the GSR600S or 'S'-model, was released middle of 2006. It differs from the standard model with a stock windshield, a radiator protector grill as well as carbon-fibre lamination for selected parts.

2007 model
ABS was introduced to the range between 2007 and 2008 across different markets.

GSR400

A Japanese domestic market model, the GSR400, become available to selected countries in the middle of 2006. With the same dimensions as the GSR600, the only difference was the engine capacity (399 cc as opposed to 599 cc), a smaller exhaust outlet, smaller RPM range and a useful plastic protective cover on the left side of the engine.

References

External links
 UK Suzuki site
 Early roadtest by Motorcycle.com

GSR600
Standard motorcycles
Motorcycles introduced in 2006